The King's Arms is a pub at 25 Roupell Street, Waterloo, London SE1.

It is a Grade II listed building, built in the early-mid 19th century.

References

External links
 
 

Grade II listed pubs in London
Grade II listed buildings in the London Borough of Lambeth
Pubs in the London Borough of Lambeth